Ahinda (A Kannada acronym for Alpasankhyataru or minorities, Hindulidavaru or backward classes, and Dalitaru or Dalits) is a Political terminology coined by the Karnataka state's first backward leader Devraj Urs, AHINDA has been reinvigorated by Siddaramaiah.

There are two explanations regarding the motives behind Ahinda. Firstly, it is a challenge to the continuing dominant caste hegemony in Karnataka politics. Secondly, it is a non-political social movement aimed at pursuing the cause of social justice to the oppressed classes.

The religious minorities, Dalit and Adivasis constitute 39% of the state’s population – Muslims and Christians (14.79%), Scheduled Castes (17.14%) and Scheduled Tribes (6.95%) and thus they form a significant electorate within the state. However political alignment is not along demographic lines because of the inherent political differences between Chalavadi and Madiga sub groups within Scheduled Castes.

See also
 Caste politics

References 

Political terminology in India
Politics of Karnataka
Political movements in India
Political neologisms